The Battle of Borodino took place near the village of Borodino on  during Napoleon's invasion of Russia. The  won the battle against the Imperial Russian Army but failed to gain a decisive victory and suffered tremendous losses. Napoleon fought against General Mikhail Kutuzov, whom the Emperor Alexander I of Russia had appointed to replace Barclay de Tolly on  after the Battle of Smolensk. After the Battle of Borodino, Napoleon remained on the battlefield with his army; the Imperial Russian forces retreated in an orderly fashion southwards. Approximately a quarter of a million soldiers were involved in the battle, and it was the bloodiest single day of the Napoleonic Wars.

Background

Napoleon's invasion of Russia

Napoleon with the French Grande Armée began his invasion of Russia on 24 June 1812 by crossing the Niemen.
As his Russian army was outnumbered by far, Mikhail Bogdanovich Barclay de Tolly successfully used a "delaying operation", defined as an operation in which a force under pressure trades space for time by slowing down the enemy's momentum and inflicting maximum damage on the enemy without, in principle, becoming decisively engaged, using a Fabian strategy as a defence in depth by retreating further eastwards into Russia without giving battle. After the Battle of Smolensk, the Tsar replaced the unpopular Barclay de Tolly with Kutuzov, who on 18 August took over the army at Tsaryovo-Zaymishche and ordered his men to prepare for battle. Kutuzov understood that Barclay's decision to retreat had been correct, but the Tsar, the Russian troops and Russia could not accept further retreat. A battle had to occur in order to preserve the morale of the soldiers and the nation. He then ordered not another retreat eastwards but a search for a battleground eastwards to Gzhatsk (Gagarin) on 30 August, by which time the ratio of French to Russian forces had shrunk from 3:1 to 5:4 thus using Barclay's delaying operation again. The main part of Napoleon's army had entered Russia with 286,000 men but by the time of the battle was reduced mostly through starvation and disease.

Kutuzov's army established a defensive line near the village of Borodino. Although the Borodino field was too open and had too few natural obstacles to protect the Russian center and the left flank, it was chosen because it blocked both Smolensk–Moscow roads and because there were simply no better locations. Starting on 3 September, Kutuzov strengthened the line with earthworks, including the Raevski redoubt (named after Nikolay Raevsky) in the center-right of the line and three open, arrow-shaped "Bagration flèches" (named after Pyotr Bagration) on the left.

Battle of Shevardino

The initial Russian position, which stretched south of the new Smolensk Highway (Napoleon's expected route of advance), was anchored on its left by a pentagonal earthwork redoubt erected on a mound near the village of Shevardino. The Russian generals soon realized that their left wing was too exposed and vulnerable, so the Russian line was moved back from this position, but the Redoubt remained manned, Kutuzov stating that the fortification was manned simply to delay the advance of the French forces. Historian Dmitry Buturlin reports that it was used as an observation point to determine the course of the French advance. Historians Witner and Ratch, and many others, reported it was used as a fortification to threaten the French right flank, despite being beyond the effective reach of guns of the period.

The Chief of Staff of the Russian 1st Army, Aleksey Yermolov, related in his memoirs that the Russian left was shifting position when the French Army arrived sooner than expected; thus, the Battle of Shevardino became a delaying effort to shield the redeployment of the Russian left. The construction of the redoubt and its purpose is disputed by historians to this day.

The conflict began on September 5 when Marshal Joachim Murat's French forces met Konovnitzyn's Russians in a massive cavalry clash, the Russians eventually retreating to the Kolorzkoi Cloister when their flank was threatened. Fighting resumed the next day but Konovnitzyn again retreated when Viceroy Eugène de Beauharnais' Fourth Corps arrived, threatening his flank. The Russians withdrew to the Shevardino Redoubt, where a pitched battle ensued. Murat led Nansouty's First Cavalry Corps and Montbrun's Second Cavalry Corps, supported by Compans's Division of Louis-Nicolas Davout's First Infantry Corps against the redoubt. Simultaneously, Prince Józef Poniatowski's Polish infantry attacked the position from the south. Fighting was heavy and very fierce, as the Russians refused to retreat until Kutuzov personally ordered them to do so. The French captured the redoubt, at a cost of 4,000–5,000 French and 6,000 Russian casualties. The small redoubt was destroyed and covered by the dead and dying of both sides.

The unexpected French advance from the west and the fall of the Shevardino redoubt threw the Russian formation into disarray. Since the left flank of their defensive position had collapsed, Russian forces withdrew to the east, constructing a makeshift position centered around the village of Utitsa. The left flank of the Russian position was thus ripe for a flanking attack.

Opposing forces

A series of reforms to the Russian army had begun in 1802, creating regiments of three battalions, each battalion having four companies. The defeats of Austerlitz, Eylau and Friedland led to important additional reforms, though continuous fighting in the course of three wars with France, two with Sweden and two with the Ottoman Empire had not allowed time for these to be fully implemented and absorbed. A divisional system was introduced in 1806, and corps were established in 1812. Prussian influence may be seen in the organizational setup. By the time of Borodino the Russian army had changed greatly from the force which met the French in 1805–07.

Russian forces present at the battle included 180 infantry battalions, 164 cavalry squadrons, 20 Cossack regiments and 55 artillery batteries (637 artillery pieces). In total, the Russians fielded 155,200 troops. There were 10,000 Cossacks as well as 33,000 Russian militiamen in the area who did not participate in the battle. After the battle the militia units were broken up to provide reinforcements to depleted regular infantry battalions. Of the 637 Russian artillery pieces, 300 were held in reserve and many of these were never committed to the battle.

According to historian Alexander Mikaberidze, the French army remained the finest army of its day by a good margin. The fusion of the legacy of the Ancien Régime with the formations of the French revolution and Napoleon's reforms had transformed it into a military machine that had dominated Europe since 1805. Each corps of the French army was in fact its own mini-army capable of independent action.

French forces included 214 battalions of infantry, 317 squadrons of cavalry and 587 artillery pieces totaling 128,000 troops. However, the French Imperial Guard, which consisted of 30 infantry battalions, 27 cavalry squadrons and 109 artillery pieces—a total of 18,500 troops—never committed to action.

Battle

Position

According to Carl von Clausewitz, although the Russian left was on marginally higher ground, this was but a superficial matter and did not provide much of a defensive advantage. The positioning of the Russian right was such that for the French the left seemed an obvious choice. The Russian position at Borodino consisted of a series of disconnected earthworks running in an arc from the Moskva River on the right, along its tributary, the Kolocha (whose steep banks added to the defense), and towards the village of Utitsa on the left. Thick woods interspersed along the Russian left and center (on the French side of the Kolocha) made the deployment and control of French forces difficult, aiding the defenders. The Russian center was defended by the Raevsky Redoubt, a massive open-backed earthwork mounting nineteen 12-pounder cannons which had a clear field of fire all the way to the banks of the Kolocha stream.

Kutuzov was very concerned that the French might take the New Smolensk Road around his positions and on to Moscow so placed the more powerful 1st Army under Barclay on the right, in positions which were already strong and virtually unassailable by the French. The 2nd Army under Bagration was expected to hold the left. The fall of Shevardino unanchored the Russian left flank but Kutuzov did nothing to change these initial dispositions despite the repeated pleas of his generals to redeploy their forces.

Thus, when the action began and became a defensive rather than an offensive battle for the Russians, their heavy preponderance in artillery was wasted on a right wing that would never be attacked, while the French artillery did much to help win the battle Colonel Karl Wilhelm von Toll and others would make attempts to cover up their mistakes in this deployment and later attempts by historians would compound the issue. Indeed, Clausewitz also complained about Toll's dispositions being so narrow and deep that needless losses were incurred from artillery fire.

Bagration's flèches

The first area of operations was on the Bagration flèches, as had been predicted by both Barclay de Tolly and Bagration.
Napoleon, in command of the French forces, made errors similar to those of his Russian adversary, deploying his forces inefficiently and failing to exploit the weaknesses in the Russian line. Despite Marshal Davout's suggestion of a maneuver to outflank the weak Russian left, the Emperor instead ordered Davout's First Corps to move directly forward into the teeth of the defense, while the flanking maneuver was left to the weak Fifth Corps of Prince Poniatowski.

The initial French attack was aimed at seizing the three Russian positions collectively known as the Bagration flèches, three arrowhead-shaped, open-backed earthworks which arced out to the left en échelon in front of the Kolocha stream. These positions helped support the Russian left, which had no terrain advantages. There was much to be desired in the construction of the flèches, one officer noting that the ditches were much too shallow, the embrasures open to the ground, making them easy to enter, and that they were much too wide, exposing infantry inside them. The flèches were supported by artillery from the village of Semyanovskaya, whose elevation dominated the other side of the Kolocha.

The battle began at 06:00 with the opening of the 102-gun French grand battery against the Russian center. Davout sent Compans's Division against the southernmost of the flèches, with Dessaix's Division echeloned out to the left. When Compans exited the woods on the far bank of the Kolocha, he was hit by massed Russian cannon fire; both Compans and Dessaix were wounded, but the French continued their assault.
Davout, seeing the confusion, personally led the 57th Line Regiment (Le Terrible) forward until he had his horse shot from under him; he fell so hard that General Sorbier reported him as dead. General Rapp arrived to replace him, only to find Davout alive and leading the 57th forward again. Rapp then led the 61st Line Regiment forward when he was wounded (for the 22nd time in his career).

By 07:30, Davout had gained control of the three flèches. Prince Bagration quickly led a counterattack that threw the French out of the positions, only to have Marshal Michel Ney lead a charge by the 24th Regiment that retook them. Although not enamoured of Barclay, Bagration turned to him for aid, ignoring Kutuzov altogether; Barclay, to his credit, responded quickly, sending three guard regiments, eight grenadier battalions and twenty-four 12-pounder cannon at their best pace to bolster Semyаnovskaya. Colonel Toll and Kutuzov moved the Guard Reserve units forward as early as 09:00 hours.

During the confused fighting, French and Russian units moved forward into impenetrable smoke and were smashed by artillery and musketry fire that was horrendous even by Napoleonic standards. Infantry and cavalrymen had difficulty maneuvering over the heaps of corpses and masses of wounded. Murat advanced with his cavalry around the flèches to attack Bagration's infantry, but was confronted by General Duka's 2nd Cuirassier Division supported by Neverovsky's infantry.

The French carried out seven assaults against the flèches and each time were beaten back in fierce close combat. Bagration in some instances was personally leading counterattacks, and in a final attempt to push the French completely back he got hit in the leg by cannonball splinters somewhere around 11:00 hours. He insisted on staying on the field to observe Duka's decisive cavalry attack.

This counter-punch drove Murat to seek the cover of allied Württemberger infantry. Barclay's reinforcements, however, were sent into the fray only to be torn to pieces by French artillery, leaving Friant's Division in control of the Russian forward position at 11:30. Dust, smoke, confusion and exhaustion all combined to keep the French commanders on the field (Davout, Ney and Murat) from comprehending that all the Russians before them had fallen back, were in confusion, and ripe for the taking.

The 2nd Army's command structure fell apart as Bagration was removed from the battlefield and the report of his being hit quickly spread and caused morale collapse. Napoleon, who had been sick with a cold and was too far from the action to really observe what was going on, refused to send his subordinates reinforcements. He was hesitant to release his last reserve, the Imperial Guard, so far from France.

First attacks on the Raevsky redoubt 

Prince Eugène de Beauharnais advanced his corps against Borodino, rushing the village and capturing it from the Russian Guard Jägers. However, the advancing columns rapidly lost their cohesion; shortly after clearing Borodino, they faced fresh Russian assault columns and retreated back to the village. General Delzons was posted to Borodino to prevent the Russians retaking it.

Morand's division then crossed to the north side of the Semyenovka stream, while the remainder of Eugène's forces traversed three bridges across the Kolocha to the south, placing them on the same side of the stream as the Russians. He then deployed most of his artillery and began to push the Russians back toward the Raevsky redoubt. Broussier and Morand's divisions then advanced together with furious artillery support. The redoubt changed hands as Barclay was forced to personally rally Paskevitch's routed regiment.

Kutuzov ordered Yermolov to take action; the general brought forward three horse artillery batteries that began to blast the open-ended redoubt, while the 3rd Battalion of the Ufa Regiment and two Jäger regiments brought up by Barclay rushed in with the bayonet to eliminate Bonami's Brigade. The Russian reinforcements' assault returned the redoubt to Russian control.

Eugène's artillery continued to pound Russian support columns, while Marshals Ney and Davout set up a crossfire with artillery positioned on the Semyonovskaya heights. Barclay countered by moving the Prussian General Eugen over to the right to support Miloradovich in his defense of the redoubt. The French responded to this move by sending forward General Sorbier, commander of the Imperial Guard artillery. Sorbier brought forth 36 artillery pieces from the Imperial Guard Artillery Park and also took command of 49 horse artillery pieces from Nansouty's Ist Cavalry Corps and La Tour Maubourg's IV Cavalry Corps, as well as of Viceroy Eugène's own artillery, opening up a massive artillery barrage.

When Barclay brought up troops against an attacking French brigade, he described it as "a walk into Hell". During the height of the battle, Kutuzov's subordinates were making all of the decisions for him; according to Colonel Carl von Clausewitz, famous for his work On War, the Russian commander "seemed to be in a trance." With the death of General Kutaisov, Chief of Artillery, most of the Russian cannon sat useless on the heights to the rear and were never ordered into battle, while the French artillery wreaked havoc on the Russians.

Cossack raid on the northern flank

On the morning of the battle at around 07:30, Don Cossack patrols from Matvei Platov's pulk had discovered a ford across the Kolocha river, on the extreme Russian right (northern) flank. Seeing that the ground in front of them was clear of enemy forces, Platov saw an opportunity to go around the French left flank and into the enemy's rear. He at once sent one of his aides to ask for permission from Kutuzov for such an operation. Platov's aide was lucky enough to encounter Colonel von Toll, an enterprising member of Kutuzov's staff, who suggested that General Uvarov's Ist Cavalry Corps be added to the operation and at once volunteered to present the plan to the commander-in-chief.

Together, they went to see Kutuzov, who nonchalantly gave his permission. There was no clear plan and no objectives had been drawn up, the whole manoeuvre being interpreted by both Kutuzov and Uvarov as a feint. Uvarov and Platov thus set off, having just around 8000 cavalrymen and 12 guns in total, and no infantry support. As Uvarov moved southwest and south and Platov moved west, they eventually arrived in the undefended rear of Viceroy Eugène's IV Corps. This was towards midday, just as the Viceroy was getting his orders to conduct another assault on the Raevski redoubt.

The sudden appearance of masses of enemy cavalry so close to the supply train and the Emperor's headquarters caused panic and consternation, prompting Eugène to immediately cancel his attack and pull back his entire Corps westwards to deal with the alarming situation. Meanwhile, the two Russian cavalry commanders tried to break what French infantry they could find in the vicinity. Having no infantry of their own, the poorly coordinated Russian attacks came to nothing.

Unable to achieve much else, Platov and Uvarov moved back to their own lines and the action was perceived as a failure by both Kutuzov and the Russian General Staff. As it turned out, the action had the utmost importance in the outcome of the battle, as it delayed the attack of the IV Corps on the Raevski redoubt for a critical two hours. During these two hours, the Russians were able to reassess the situation, realize the terrible state of Bagration's 2nd Army and send reinforcements to the front line. Meanwhile, the retreat of Viceroy Eugène's Corps had left Montbrun's II French Cavalry Corps to fill the gap under the most murderous fire, which used up and demoralized these cavalrymen, greatly reducing their combat effectiveness. The delay contradicted a military principle the Emperor had stated many times: "Ground I may recover, time never." The Cossack raid contributed to Napoleon's later decision not to commit his Imperial Guard to battle.

Final attack on Raevsky redoubt

At 14:00, Napoleon renewed the assault against the redoubt, as Broussier's, Morand's and Gérard's divisions launched a massive frontal attack, with Chastel's light cavalry division on their left and the II Reserve Cavalry Corps on their right;

The Russians sent Likhachov's 24th Division into the battle, who fought bravely under Likhachov's motto: "Brothers, behind us is Moscow!" But the French troops approached too close for the cannons to fire, and the cannoneers fought a pitched close-order defence against the attackers. General Caulaincourt ordered Watier's cuirassier division to lead the assault. Barclay saw Eugène's preparations for the assault and attempted to counter it, moving his forces against it. The French artillery, however, began bombarding the assembling force even as it gathered. Caulaincourt led Watier's cuirassiers in an assault on the opening at the back of the redoubt; he was killed as the charge was beaten off by fierce Russian musketry.

General Thielmann then led eight Saxon and two Polish cavalry squadrons against the back of the redoubt, while officers and sergeants of his command actually forced their horses through the redoubt's embrasures, sowing confusion amongst the defenders and allowing the French cavalry and infantry to take the position. The battle had all but ended, with both sides so exhausted that only the artillery was still at work. At 15:30, the Raevsky redoubt fell with most of the 24th Division's troops. General Likhachov was captured by the French.

Utitsa 
The third area of operations was around the village of Utitsa. The village was at the southern end of the Russian positions and lay along the old Smolensk road. It was rightly perceived as a potential weak point in the defense as a march along the road could turn the entire position at Borodino. Despite such concerns the area was a tangle of rough country thickly covered in heavy brush well suited for deploying light infantry. The forest was dense, the ground marshy, and Russian Jaegers were deployed there in some numbers. Russian General Nikolay Tuchkov had some 23,000 troops but half were untrained Opolchenye (militia) armed only with pikes and axes and not ready for deployment.

Poniatowski had about 10,000 men, all trained and eager to fight, but his first attempt did not go well. It was at once realized the massed troops and artillery could not move through the forest against Jaeger opposition so had to reverse to Yelnya and then move eastward. Tuchkov had deployed his 1st Grenadier Division in line backing it with the 3rd division in battalion columns. Some four regiments were called away to help defend the redoubts that were under attack and another 2 Jaeger regiments were deployed in the Utitsa woods, weakening the position.

The Polish contingent contested control of Utitsa village, capturing it with their first attempt. Tuchkov later ejected the French forces by 08:00. General Jean-Andoche Junot led the Westphalians to join the attack and again captured Utitsa, which was set on fire by the departing Russians. After the village's capture, Russians and Poles continued to skirmish and cannonade for the rest of the day without much progress. The heavy undergrowth greatly hindered Poniatowski's efforts but eventually he came near to cutting off Tuchkov from the rest of the Russian forces.
General Barclay sent help in the form of Karl Gustav von Baggovut with Konovnitzyn in support. Any hope of real progress by the Poles was then lost.

Napoleon's refusal to commit the Guard
Towards 15:00, after hours of resistance, the Russian army was in dire straits, but the French forces were exhausted and had neither the necessary stamina nor will to carry out another assault. Both armies were exhausted after the battle and the Russians withdrew from the field the following day. Borodino represented the last Russian effort at stopping the French advance on Moscow, which fell a week later. At this crucial juncture, Murat's chief of staff, General Augustin Daniel Belliard rode straight to the Emperor's Headquarters and, according to General Ségur who wrote an account of the campaign, told him that the Russian line had been breached, that the road to Mozhaysk, behind the Russian line, was visible through the gaping hole the French attack had pierced, that an enormous crowd of runaways and vehicles were hastily retreating, and that a final push would be enough to decide the fate of the Russian army and of the war. Generals Daru, Dumas and Marshal Louis Alexandre Berthier also joined in and told the Emperor that everyone thought the time had come for the Guard to be committed to battle.

Given the ferocity of the Russian defense, everyone was aware that such a move would cost the lives of thousands of Guardsmen, but it was thought that the presence of this prestigious unit would bolster the morale of the entire army for a final decisive push. A notable exception was Marshal Bessières, commander of the Guard cavalry, who was one of the very few senior generals to strongly advise against the intervention of the Guard. As the general staff were discussing the matter, General Rapp, a senior aide-de-camp to the Emperor, was being brought from the field of battle, having been wounded in action.

Rapp immediately recommended to the Emperor that the Guard be deployed for action at which the Emperor is said to have retorted: "I will most definitely not; I do not want to have it blown up. I am certain of winning the battle without its intervention." Determined not to commit this valuable final reserve so far away from France, Napoleon rejected another such request, this time from Marshal Ney. Instead, he called the commander of the "Young Guard", Marshal Mortier and instructed him to guard the field of battle without moving forward or backward, while at the same time unleashing a massive cannonade with his 400 guns.

End of the battle
Napoleon went forward to see the situation from the former Russian front lines shortly after the redoubts had been taken. The Russians had moved to the next ridge-line in much disarray; however, that disarray was not clear to the French, with dust and haze obscuring the Russian dispositions. Kutuzov ordered the Russian Guard to hold the line and so it did. All of the artillery that the French army had was not enough to move it. Those compact squares made good artillery targets and the Russian Guard stood in place from 4 pm to 6 pm unmoving under its fire, resulting in huge casualties. All he could see were masses of troops in the distance and thus nothing more was attempted. Neither the attack, which relied on brute force, nor the refusal to use the Guard to finish the day's work, showed any brilliance on Napoleon's part.

Carl von Clausewitz, the Prussian historian and future author of On War, and Alexander I of Russia both noted that the poor positioning of the Russian troops had particularly hobbled the defense. Barclay communicated with Kutuzov in order to receive further instructions. According to Ludwig von Wolzogen (in an account dripping with sarcasm), the commander was found a half-hour away on the road to Moscow, encamped with an entourage of young nobles and grandly pronouncing he would drive Napoleon off the next day.

Despite his bluster, Kutuzov knew from dispatches that his army had been too badly hurt to fight a continuing action the following day. He knew exactly what he was doing: by fighting the pitched battle, he could now retreat with the Russian army still intact, lead its recovery, and force the weakened French forces to move even further from their bases of supply. The dénouement became a textbook example of what a hold logistics placed upon an army far from its center of supply. On September 8, the Russian army moved away from the battlefield in twin columns, allowing Napoleon to occupy Moscow and await for five weeks a Russian surrender that would never come.

Kutuzov would proclaim over the course of several days that the Russian Army would fight again before the walls of Moscow. In fact, a site was chosen near Poklonnaya Gora within a few miles of Moscow as a battle site. However, the Russian Army had not received enough reinforcements, and it was too risky to cling to Moscow at all costs. Kutuzov understood that the Russian people never wanted to abandon Moscow, the city which was regarded as Russia's "second capital"; however he also believed that the Russian Army did not have enough forces to protect that city. Kutuzov called for a council of war in the afternoon of 13 September at Fili village. In a heated debate that split the council five to four in favour of giving battle, Kutuzov, after listening to each General, endorsed retreat. Thus passed the last chance of battle before Moscow was taken.

Historiography
It is not unusual for a pivotal battle of this era to be difficult to document. Similar difficulties exist with the Battle of Waterloo or battles of the War of 1812 in North America, while the Battle of Borodino offers its own particular challenges to accuracy. It has been repeatedly subjected to overtly political uses.

Personal accounts of the battle frequently magnified an individual's own role or minimised those of rivals. The politics of the time were complex and complicated by ethnic divisions between native Russian nobility and those having second and third-generation German descent, leading to rivalry for positions in command of the army. Not only does a historian have to deal with the normal problem of a veteran looking back and recalling events as he or she would have liked them to have been, but in some cases outright malice was involved. Nor was this strictly a Russian event, as bickering and sabotage were known amongst the French marshals and their reporting generals. To "lie like a bulletin" was a recognised phrase amongst his troops. It was not just a French affair either, with Kutuzov in particular promoting an early form of misinformation that has continued to this day. Further distortions occurred during the Soviet years, when an adherence to a "formula" was the expectation during the Stalin years and for some time after that. The over-reliance of western histories on the battle and of the campaign on French sources has been noted by later historians.

The views of historians of the outcome of the battle changed with the passage of time and the changing political situations surrounding them. Kutuzov proclaimed a victory both to the army and to Emperor Alexander. While many a general throughout history claimed victory out of defeat (Ramses II of Egypt did so) and in this case, Kutuzov was commander-in-chief of the entire Russian army, and it was an army that, despite the huge losses, considered itself undefeated. Announcing a defeat would have removed Kutuzov from command, and damaged the morale of the proud soldiers. While Alexander was not deceived by the announcement, it gave him the justification needed to allow Kutuzov to march his army off to rebuild the Russian forces and later complete the near utter destruction of the French army. As such, what was said by Kutuzov and those supporting his views was allowed to pass into the histories of the time unchecked.

Histories during the Soviet era raised the battle to a mythic contest with serious political overtones and had Kutuzov as the master tactician on the battlefield, directing every move with the precision of a ballet master directing his troupe. Kutuzov's abilities on the battlefield were, in the eyes of his contemporaries and fellow Russian generals, far more complex and often described in less than flattering terms. Noted author and historian David G. Chandler writing in 1966, echoes the Soviet era Russian histories in more than a few ways, asserting that General Kutuzov remained in control of the battle throughout, ordered counter-moves to Napoleon's tactics personally rather than Bagration and Barclay doing so and put aside personal differences to overcome the dispositional mistakes of the Russian army. Nor is the tent scene played out; instead Kutuzov remains with the army. Chandler also has the Russian army in much better shape moving to secondary prepared positions and seriously considering attacking the next day. Later historians Riehn and Mikaberidze have Kutuzov leaving most of the battle to Bagration and Barclay de Tolly, leaving early in the afternoon and relaying orders from his camp 30 minutes from the front.

His dispositions for the battle are described as a clear mistake leaving the right far too strong and the left much too weak. Only the fact that Bagration and Barclay were to cooperate fully saved the Russian army and did much to mitigate the bad positioning. Nothing would be more damning than 300 artillery pieces standing silent on the Russian right.

Casualties

The fighting involved around 250,000 troops and left at least 68,000 killed and wounded, making Borodino the deadliest single-day-battle of the Napoleonic Wars and one of the bloodiest single-day battles in the military history until the First Battle of the Marne in 1914.

The casualties of the battle were staggering: according to French General Staff Inspector P. Denniee, the Grande Armée lost approximately 28,000 soldiers: 6,562 (including 269 officers) were reported as dead, 21,450 as wounded. But according to French historian Aristid Martinien, at least 460 French officers (known by name) were killed in battle. In total, the Grande Armée lost 1,928 officers dead and wounded, including 49 generals. The list of slain included French Generals of Division Auguste-Jean-Gabriel de Caulaincourt, Louis-Pierre Montbrun, Jean Victor Tharreau and Generals of Brigade Claude Antoine Compère, François Auguste Damas, Léonard Jean Aubry Huard de Saint-Aubin, Jean Pierre Lanabère, Charles Stanislas Marion, Louis Auguste Marchand Plauzonne and Jean Louis Romeuf.

Suffering a wound on the Borodino battlefield was effectively a death sentence, as French forces did not possess enough food for the healthy, much less the sick; consequently, equal numbers of wounded soldiers starved to death, died of their injuries, or perished through neglect. The casualties were for a single day of battle, while the Russian figures are for the 5th and the 7th, combined. Using the same accounting method for both armies brings the actual French Army casualty count to 34,000–35,000.

Both the French and Russians suffered terrible casualties during the fighting, losing over a third of their armies. Some 52,000 Russian troops were reported as dead, wounded or missing, including 1,000 prisoners; some 8,000 men were separated from their units and returned over the next few days, bringing the total Russian losses to 44,000. Twenty-two Russian generals were killed or wounded, including Prince Bagration, who died of his wounds on 24 September. Historian Gwynne Dyer compared the carnage at Borodino to "a loaded 747 crashing, with no survivors, every 5 minutes for eight hours." Taken as a one-day battle in the scope of the Napoleonic conflict, this was the bloodiest battle of this series of conflicts with combined casualties between 72,000 and 73,000. The next nearest battle would be Waterloo, at about 55,000 for the day. The French lost about roughly the same number of soldiers. However, the Russian Empire, being a massive country with a huge population, could relieve these losses quickly whilst Napoleon could not. Therefore, both sides had their victories and defeats, with none reaching a decisive goal.

In the historiography of this battle, the figures would be deliberately inflated or underplayed by the generals of both sides attempting to lessen the impact the figures would have on public opinion both during aftermath of the battle or, for political reasons, later during the Soviet period.

Aftermath

Attrition warfare
Although the Battle of Borodino is classified as a victory for Napoleon since he and his men managed to capture Moscow, his armies were badly bludgeoned and plundered from the fierce defense of the Imperial Russian army. Also, the city was actually used as bait to lure and trap the French forces. When Napoleon and his men visited the city, he found that it was burnt and abandoned upon his arrival. While Napoleon was in Moscow, he sent a letter to the tsar who was residing in Saint Petersburg demanding that he surrender and accept defeat. Napoleon received no response. Whilst patiently waiting for an answer from the tsar, as soon as the cold winter and snowfall started to form, Napoleon, realizing what was happening, attempted to escape the country with his men. Seeing that they were fleeing, the Imperial Russian army launched a massive attack on the French. Attrition warfare was used by Kutuzov by burning Moscow's resources, guerrilla warfare by the Cossacks against any kind of transport and total war by the peasants against foraging. This kind of warfare weakened the French army at its most vulnerable point: logistics, as it was unable to pillage Russian land, which was insufficiently populated nor cultivated, meaning that starvation became the most dangerous enemy long before the cold joined in.
The feeding of horses by supply trains was extremely difficult, as a ration for a horse weighs about ten times as much as one for a man. It was tried in vain to feed and water all the horses by foraging expeditions. It also did not help that Napoleon and his men were exhausted and beaten-up by the Imperial Russian resistance that happened at Borodino and thus could not offer much of a fight. Of the 600,000+ soldiers who invaded the Russian Empire, less than 100,000 returned.

Pyrrhic victory
Most scholars and contemporaries describe Borodino as a Pyrrhic victory. Russian historian Oleg Sokolov posits that Borodino constituted a Pyrrhic victory for the French, which would ultimately cost Napoleon the war and his crown, although at the time none of this was apparent to either side. Sokolov adds that the decision to not commit the Guard saved the Russians from an Austerlitz-style defeat and quotes Marshal Laurent de Gouvion Saint-Cyr, one of Napoleon's finest strategists, who analyzed the battle and concluded that an intervention of the Guard would have torn the Russian army to pieces and allowed Napoleon to safely follow his plans to take winter quarters in Moscow and resume his successful campaign in spring or offer the Tsar acceptable peace terms. Digby Smith calls Borodino 'a draw' but believes that posterity proved Napoleon right in his decision to not commit the Guard so far away from his homeland. According to Christopher Duffy, the battle of Borodino could be seen as a new Battle of Torgau, in which both of the sides sustained terrible losses but neither could achieve their tactical goals, and the battle itself did not have a clear result, although both sides claimed the battle as their own victory.

However, in what had become a war of attrition, the battle was just one more source of losses to the French when they were losing two men to one. Both the French and the Russians suffered terribly but the Russians had reserve troops, and a clear logistical advantage. The French Army supplies came over a long road lined with hostile forces. According to Riehn, so long as the Russian Army existed the French continued to lose.

This victory of Napoleon was not decisive, but it allowed the French emperor to occupy Moscow to await a surrender that would never come. The capture of Moscow proved a Pyrrhic victory, since the Russians had no intention of negotiating with Napoleon for peace. Historian Riehn notes that the Borodino victory allowed Napoleon to move on to Moscow, where—even allowing for the arrival of reinforcements—the French Army only possessed a maximum of 95,000 men, who would be ill-equipped to win a battle due to a lack of supplies and ammunition. The main part of the Grande Armée suffered more than 90,000 casualties by the time of the Moscow retreat, see Minard's map; typhus, dysentery, starvation and hypothermia ensured that only about 10,000 men of the main force returned across the Russian border alive. Furthermore, although the Russian army suffered heavy casualties in the battle, it regrouped by the time of Napoleon's retreat from Moscow; it soon began to interfere with the French withdrawal and made it a catastrophe.

Legacy

Pyotr Ilyich Tchaikovsky also composed his 1812 Overture to commemorate the battle.

The battle was famously described by Leo Tolstoy in his novel War and Peace: "After the shock that had been received, the French army was still able to crawl to Moscow; but there, without any new efforts on the part of the Russian troops, it was doomed to perish, bleeding to death from the mortal wound received at Borodino." The battle was depicted on Sergei Bondarchuk's film adaptation of Tolstoy's novel, which on Part III of the film devoted 35 minutes to a monumental depiction of the battle, using 12,000 Soviet troops. The narrator in the movie makes the claim that the moral victory of the Russian side led directly to the end of Napoleon's empire.

Poet Mikhail Lermontov romanticized the battle in his poem Borodino.

A huge panorama representing the battle was painted by Franz Roubaud for the centenary of Borodino and installed on the Poklonnaya Hill in Moscow to mark the 150th anniversary of the event.

In Russia, the Battle of Borodino is reenacted yearly on the first Sunday of September.

On the battlefield itself, the Bagration flèches are preserved; a modest monument has been constructed in honour of the French soldiers who fell in the battle.

A commemorative one-ruble coin was released in the Soviet Union in 1987 to commemorate the 175th anniversary of the Battle of Borodino, and four million were minted.

A minor planet 3544 Borodino, discovered by Soviet astronomer Nikolai Stepanovich Chernykh in 1977 was named after the village of Borodino.

From May 1813 to the present, at least 29 ships have been named Borodino after the battle (see list of ships named Borodino), and many others after participants in the battle: 24 ships in honor of Mikhail Kutuzov, 18 ships in honor of Matvei Platov, 15 ships in honor of Pyotr Bagration, 33 ships in honor of the Cossacks, four ships in honor of Denis Davydov, two ships each in honor of Louis-Alexandre Berthier, Jean-Baptiste Bessières and Michel Ney; and one ship each in honor of the officers of the Marine Guards crew I.P. Kartsov, N.P. Rimsky-Korsakov and M.N. Lermontov; Prince Vorontsov, generals Yermolov and Raevsky, Marshal of the Empire Louis-Nicolas Davout.

See also
 Military career of Napoleon Bonaparte
 List of battles of the French invasion of Russia
 Nikolay Vuich
 Ivan Shevich
 Andrei Miloradovich
 Avram Ratkov
 Ivan Adamovich
 Nikolay Bogdanov
 Ilya Duka
 Georgi Emmanuel
 Peter Ivanovich Ivelich

Explanatory notes

Notes

References

External links 

 First-hand account of the battle by Louis-François, Baron Lejeune a French aide-de-camp
 Borodino: maps, diagrams, illustrations
 The celebration of the centennial anniversary of Victory in the Patriotic war of 1812. Emperor Nicholas II on Borodinsky celebrations 1912.
 The Battle of Borodino, situation at 12.30 p.m. Visual tour of Borodino Panorama by Franz A. Roubaud
 The battle of Borodino reconstruction. 195 Anniversary Photos
 French Army, Battle of Borodino, 5–7 September 1812 (George Nafziger collection)
 Russian Army, Battle of Borodino, 5–7 September 1812 (George Nafziger collection) 
 

1812 in the Russian Empire
Battles inscribed on the Arc de Triomphe
Battles involving France
Battles involving Poland
Battles involving Russia
Battles involving the Kingdom of Italy (Napoleonic)
Battles of the French invasion of Russia
Battles of the Napoleonic Wars
Conflicts in 1812
History of Moscow Oblast
September 1812 events
Joachim Murat